Fata Morgana is a 2007 German film directed by Simon Groß and starring Matthias Schweighöfer, Marie Zielcke and Jean-Hugues Anglade. The film is about a young couple ending up lost in the desert and
being forced to trust a shady stranger to lead them back to civilisation.

Plot

Daniel (Matthias Schweighöfer) and Laura (Marie Zielcke) are a young couple vacationing in Morocco. They rent an off-road vehicle for a day trip to the desert. At a gas station they meet a shady stranger (Jean-Hugues Anglade), who offers them to show them the desert. Declining his offer the two continue their trip and spontaneously decide to veer off the road. After making love on a dune they find out that their vehicle does not start. They set out on foot, but are soon lost as their tracks have been blown away by the wind.

Luckily the tight-lipped stranger appears out of nowhere and helps them repair their vehicle and promises to show them the way out of the desert. They follow him on his motor bike with their vehicle but become suspicious of motives when they find out that he seemingly leads them away from the road. Tensions appear, not only between the couple and the stranger, but also between Daniel and Laura. When Daniel walks away from the vehicle after having an argument with Laura, the stranger seduces Laura and makes love with her. Daniel, who senses what has happened punctures the tires of the stranger's motor bike with a knife. Together the couples drives away, arguing on the way. When they reach an ancient and deserted town in the middle of the desert Laura walks away. Daniel tries to find her in the narrow alleys of the town, but suddenly encounters the stranger, who has seemingly followed them. He draws his knife and attacks the stranger, but is soon disarmed. Laura comes to his help and strikes the stranger with a stone on his head. They try to bring the stranger to a hospital, but ultimately leave him in the desert after being convinced that he is dead. Following power poles they drive back to the road. A few days later they return to the place where the left the stranger. They only find a bloody bandage and footprints leading away from the place.

External links
 

2007 films
2007 psychological thriller films
Films set in Morocco
Films set in deserts
German psychological thriller films
2000s German films